The Hong Kong basketball team is the representative basketball team of Hong Kong. It is managed by the Hong Kong Basketball Association (HKBA).

Competitions

FIBA Asia Cup

Asian Games

Current roster
2022 Squad:

Depth chart

Past rosters
Roster for the 2017 FIBA Asia Cup.

Head coach position
 Yin Ming Chu – 2009
 Wai Cheung Kwong – 2010–2014
 On Hing King – 2015–

Kit

Manufacturer
2006-Present: Nike

See also
Hong Kong national under-19 basketball team
Hong Kong national under-17 basketball team
Hong Kong national 3x3 team
Hong Kong women's national basketball team

References

External links
Official website
FIBA profile
Asiabasket.com
Hong Kong Basketball Records at FIBA Archive
Kuwait v Hong Kong - Group B - Game Highlights - 2015 FIBA Asia Championship Youtube.com video

Hong Kong national basketball team
1957 establishments in Hong Kong
basketball
Men's national basketball teams